Petar Nikolaev Atanasov (Bulgarian: Петър Николаев Атанасов; born 13 October 1990) is a Bulgarian footballer who plays as a forward for Bulgarian Second League club Maritsa.

Career
Atanasov's career began at the FC Rakovski. At the age of just 16, Petar was scouted by Lokomotiv Plovdiv and he joined their youth system. In the 2006–07 season he was promoted to the first team of Lokomotiv and on 4 May 2007 he made his A PFG  debut in a 3–0 away loss against Belasitsa Petrich.

References

External links
 

1990 births
Living people
Bulgarian footballers
Bulgaria under-21 international footballers
Association football midfielders
PFC Lokomotiv Plovdiv players
Botev Plovdiv players
PFC Chernomorets Burgas players
PFC Slavia Sofia players
FC Montana players
FC Botev Vratsa players
FC Tsarsko Selo Sofia players
First Professional Football League (Bulgaria) players
Second Professional Football League (Bulgaria) players
People from Rakovski